is Olivia's first solo single released on February 3, 1999 under the label Avex Trax. The song was written by T2ya. It peaked at 32nd place on the Oricon weekly singles chart and charted for four weeks. The single was used as an ending theme song in the TV show G Paradise, as well as in a commercial for Morinaga & Company.

Her debut single marks a shift away from the upbeat dance-pop oriented music from her days in D&D to a more alternative rock sound.

The music video was shot on January 17, 1999 at a studio in Japan.

Track listing
 
 
 "I.L.Y. (Yokubō) (Instrumental)"
 "Hanabira (Instrumental)"

References

1999 singles
Olivia Lufkin songs
Song recordings produced by T2ya
Songs written by T2ya
1999 songs
Avex Trax singles